Joseph Opatoshu (January 1, 1886 – October 7, 1954) was a Polish-born Yiddish novelist and short story writer.  He was the father of actor David Opatoshu.

Biography
Opatoshu was born in 1886 as Yosef Meir Opatowski to Jewish parents, Dovid and Nantshe, near Mława, Congress Poland.

His father, a wood merchant, came from a Hasidic family and had become a Maskil. He sent Yosef to the best Polish schools in the country. At the age of 19 Yosef went to study engineering in Nancy, France. However, privation sent him to the United States in 1907, where he settled in New York City, where his name became Joseph Opatovsky, and he later took the professional name of Joseph Opatoshu.

Works

Novels
 1914 From the New York Ghetto
 1914 Di naye heym
 1918 Alone: Romance of a Forest-Girl
 1919 Hebrew
 1921 In Polish Woods
 אין פּוילישע וועלדער, 1921; translated to English from the Yiddish by Isaac Goldberg: In Polish woods, The Jewish Publication Society of America, 1938
 1926 1863
 ראָמאַן פֿון א פֿערד־גנבֿ ,1917; A roman fun a ferd ganev (Romance of a Horsethief)
 The Last Revolt, the story of Rabbi Akiba; translated from the Yiddish by Moshe Spiegel, The Jewish Publication Society of America, 1952
 אַ טאָג אין רעגענסבורג, Di Goldene Pave Paris 1955; translated to English from the Yiddish by Jacob Sloan: A day in Regensburg; short stories, The Jewish Publication Society of America, 1968
 The Dancer
 A Day in Regensburg, a writing about Jewish German Life in the sixteenth century
 Bar-Kokhba (1953), a Hebrew novel

Film adaptation
 A film based on Romance of a Horsethief was released in 1971. His son, David Opatoshu wrote the screenplay and it was directed by Abraham Polonsky. The cast includes Yul Brynner as Captain Stoloff, Eli Wallach as Kifke, Jane Birkin as Naomi, and his son David as Schloime Kradnik.

References

External links
 Works by Joseph Opatoshu in the Steven Spielberg Digital Library
 Works by Joseph Opatoshu in Hebrew translation. Chabadlibrary.org
 
 
 Joseph Opatoshu's tombstone on the University of Cape Town "Tomb Stone Exhibit" web site
  Studio portrait of (right to left) Moshe (Moses) Kulbak, Joseph Opatoshu, Maks Eryk and Zalman Reisen, board members of the Yiddish P.E.N. Club.1928 (from the Vilna page on the Eilat Gordin Levitan web site)
 Portrait by Marc Chagall on the McGill University Digital Collections Program web site
 "Workbook" on the Asch-Howe Quarrel, on the Hartford, Connecticut, Trinity College web site

1886 births
1954 deaths
Jewish American writers
Polish emigrants to the United States
Yiddish-language writers
19th-century Polish Jews